Zaniolepis, the combfishes, is a genus of marine ray-finned fish, it is one of two genera in the family Zaniolepididae. These fishes are native to the eastern Pacific Ocean.  Z. frenata that was a source of food to the Native American inhabitants of San Nicolas Island off the coast of southern California, United States during the Middle Holocene.

Taxonomy
Zaniolepis was first proposed as a monospecific genus in 1858 by the French zoologist Charles Frédéric Girard when he described Z. longispinis from Fort Steilacoom on Puget Sound in Washington. This genus is one of two genera in the family Zaniolepidae, each of which is classified within a monotypic subfamily. The subfamily Zaniolepinae, along with the Oxylebiinae, haves been classified as two subfamilies in the Hexagrammidae.

Etymology
Zaniolepis is a combination of xanion, which is a Greek word for a comb used to card wool, and lepis, meaning "scale", referring to the overlapping, almost ctenoid scales of Z. latipinnis.

Species
The currently recognized species in this genus are:

Characteristics
Zaniolepis combfishes have a deep incision in the rear third their dorsal finand the first 3 spines in the dorsal fin are highly elongated, extremely so in Z. latipinnis. The anal fin contains 3 spines while the first 2 rays in the pelvic fins are long and robust and extend past the origin of the anal fin. The caudal fin truncated.

Distribution and habitat
Zaniolepis combfishes are found in the eastern North Pacific Ocean from Alaska to Baja California. They are benthic fishes.

References

Zaniolepididae
 
Pleistocene fish
Scorpaeniformes genera
Pleistocene fish of North America
Extant Pleistocene first appearances